Poveri ma ricchissimi is a 2017 Italian comedy film directed by Fausto Brizzi.

The film is a sequel to 2016 Poveri ma ricchi.

Cast
Christian De Sica as Danilo Tucci
Enrico Brignano as Marcello Bertocchi
Lucia Ocone as Loredana Bertocchi
Lodovica Comello as Valentina
Anna Mazzamauro as granma Nicoletta
Paolo Rossi as Libero
Giulio Bartolomei as Kevi Tucci
Federica Lucaferri as Tamara Tucci
Massimo Ciavarro as Rudy
Ubaldo Pantani as Gustavo
Tess Masazza as Cloe
Giobbe Covatta as Don Genesio
Dario Cassini as Prime Minister
Nicolò De Devitiis as himself

References

External links

2017 films
Films directed by Fausto Brizzi
2010s Italian-language films
2017 comedy films
Italian comedy films
Italian sequel films
2010s Italian films